Mixtape, Vol. 1 is the third  extended play (EP) by American country music singer Kane Brown. The seven-song EP was released on August 14, 2020, as his second EP with the Sony Music Nashville label, with the first Sony EP being Chapter 1. He had earlier released an independent EP on his own label, titled Closer.

Background and release
Brown co-wrote all seven songs on the EP, with co-writing songwriters being Shy Carter, Sam Ellis and Matt McGinn. Dann Huff produced or co-produced five of the seven songs.

Mixtape Vol. 1 includes the single "Cool Again", a pre-release from April 2020, and the lead single off the EP. 

It was followed  by "Worldwide Beautiful" in June 2020, aimed to highlight peace and equality; it benefits the Boys and Girls Club of America. It also gained notability being released after the murder of George Floyd. The music video, winner of the 2021 ACM Awards Video of the Year, was filmed partly on the property of session and touring bassist Todd Ashburn in the Nashville area, and in downtown Mt. Pleasant, Tennessee.

"Be Like That", a collaboration with Swae Lee and Khalid, was the last release in July 2020, immediately preceding the release of the EP on August 14. Brown also had some chart success with the track "Worship You", which was later released as a single to country radio.

Track listing

Personnel
Adapted from liner notes.

Robert Bailey - background vocals
Charlie Bisharat - concert master (track 6)
Danielle Blakey - background vocals
Christopher Blue - background vocals
Jacob Braun - cello (track 6)
Kane Brown - lead vocals, background vocals
David Campbell - string arrangements (track 6)
Shy Carter - background vocals
Dave Cohen - B-3 organ, piano
Andrew Duckles - viola (track 6)
Stuart Duncan - fiddle
Jason Eskridge - background vocals
Kim Fleming - background vocals
Paul Franklin - steel guitar
Andrew Goldstein - guitar (track 6), keyboards (track 6), programming (track 6), shakers (track 6), synth bass (track 6)
Vicki Hampton - background vocals
Kyla Harris - background vocals
Dann Huff - B-3 organ, electric guitar, electric guitar solo, gut string guitar, piano, programming, mandocello, synthesizer, synth bass, tambourine
David Huff - programming, synthesizer, synth bass
Charlie Judge - B-3 organ, keyboards, piano, strings, synthesizer
Khalid - featured vocals (track 2)
Swae Lee - featured vocals (track 2)
John Legend - piano (track 6), duet vocals (track 6)
Matt McGinn - background vocals
Miles McPherson - drums
Justin Niebank - programming
Sara Parkins - violin (track 6)
Michael Piroli - Engineer (track 2)
Lindsay Rimes - banjo, bass guitar, dobro, electric guitar, keyboards, programming, steel guitar, synthesizer, synth bass, vocoder, background vocals
Jerry Roe - drums
Jimmie Lee Sloas - bass guitar
Tereza Stanislav - violin (track 6)
Aaron Sterling - drums, percussion
Russell Terrell - background vocals 
Ilya Toshinsky - acoustic guitar, banjo, bouzouki, dobro, dulcimer, electric guitar, mandolin
Travis Toy - steel guitar
Josephina Vergara - violin (track 6)
Derek Wells - electric guitar
Alex Wright - keyboards

Charts

Weekly charts

Year-end charts

References

2020 EPs
Kane Brown EPs